One for All is the final studio album by drummer Art Blakey and the Jazz Messengers, recorded in 1990 and released on the A&M label.

Reception

The Los Angeles Times called trumpeter Brian Lynch "a splendid writer and soloist."

Scott Yanow of AllMusic stated: "The final recording by Art Blakey's Jazz Messengers found the 70-year old drummer (just months before his death) doing what he loved best, leading a group of young players through hard-swinging and generally new music in the hard-bop style... A satisfying final effort from an irreplaceable drummer and bandleader".

Track listing 
 "Here We Go" (Art Blakey) - 0:28   
 "One for All (And All for One)" (Steve Davis) - 6:40   
 "Theme for Penny" (Javon Jackson) - 6:30   
 "You've Changed" (Bill Carey, Carl Fischer) - 7:13   
 "Accidentally Yours" (Geoffrey Keezer) - 5:10   
 "My Little Brown Book" (Billy Strayhorn) - 2:43   
 "Blame It on My Youth" (Edward Heyman, Oscar Levant) - 1:45   
 "It Could Happen to You" (Jimmy Van Heusen, Johnny Burke) -  3:53
 "Green is Mean" (Brian Lynch) - 5:25   
 "I'll Wait and Pray" (George Treadwell, Gerald Valentine) - 7:32   
 "Logarythmns" (Blakey) - 2:26   
 "Bunyip" (Dale Barlow) - 6:38   
 "Polka Dots and Moonbeams" (Van Heusen, Burke) - 4:21   
 "Nica's Tempo" (Gigi Gryce) - 6:27

Personnel 
Art Blakey - drums
Brian Lynch - trumpet 
Steve Davis - trombone
Dale Barlow, Javon Jackson - tenor saxophone 
Geoff Keezer - piano 
Essiet Okon Essiet - bass

References 

Art Blakey albums
The Jazz Messengers albums
1990 albums
A&M Records albums